The Porticus Deorum Consentium, sometimes known as the Area of the Dii Consentes, is an ancient structure located at the bottom of the ancient Roman road that leads up to the Capitol in Rome, Italy. The Clivus Capitolinus ("Capitoline Rise") turned sharply at the head of the Roman Forum where this portico of marble and composite material was discovered and re-erected in 1835.

History
It was last rebuilt in 367 AD and was thus the last functioning pagan shrine in the Forum (such shrines had been forbidden by law more than a decade earlier). The Portico housed twelve recessed rooms where it is believed the judicial clerks of the Capitoline Assent held their offices.

See also
List of ancient monuments in Rome

References

External links

367 establishments
360s establishments in the Roman Empire
4th-century religious buildings and structures
1835 archaeological discoveries
Ancient Roman buildings and structures in Rome
Roman Forum
Rome R. X Campitelli
Dii Consentes
Shrines